The Latvian Museum of National History, is a national history museum in Riga, Latvia.

It was founded in 1869 by the Riga Latvian Society.

Since 1920 it has been located in Riga Castle and in 1924 it attained state museum status. Its mission is "to collect, preserve, research and popularise spiritual and material culture from Latvia and the world from ancient times until today, which has archaeological, ethnographic, numismatic, historical or artistic significance, in the interests of the Latvian nation and its people".

Since May 2014 the main exhibition space has been temporarily located on Freedom Boulevard (Brīvības bulvāris) in a three-story building dating from 1875, originally constructed as a family home by architect Heinrich Scheel. The location is close to the Freedom Monument. From 1946 to 2009 the building was used as the Faculty of History and Philosophy of the University of Latvia. After reconstruction and restoration works are finalized at Riga Castle, the museum is scheduled to move back to its permanent premises in 2018.

The Popular Front museum, located in the former headquarters of that organization from the Third Awakening, came under the museum in January 2015.

Gallery

References

External links
 

Museums in Riga
Museums established in 1869
History museums in Latvia
National museums in Latvia
1869 establishments in the Russian Empire